Martin Carey (born 30 June 1974) is an Irish hurler who played as a goalkeeper for the Kilkenny senior team.

Biography
A brother of one of the all-time greats of hurling D. J. Carey, he joined the team during the 1995-96 National League and was a regular member of the team until his retirement from inter-county hurling after four seasons. An All-Ireland medalist in the minor and under-21 grades, Carey won an All-Ireland winners' medal in the senior grade as a  substitute. Martin also won 2 Leinster Senior Colleges; 2 All-Ireland Senior Colleges; 1 Minor All-Ireland; 3 Leinster Under 21; 1 All-Ireland Under 21.

At club level Carey is a two-time county club championship medalist with the Young Irelands club.

References

1974 births
Living people
Young Irelands (Kilkenny) hurlers
Kilkenny inter-county hurlers
Hurling goalkeepers
Hurling selectors